S32 Jingping Expressway is an expressway in Beijing, China.

Construction stages
Construction started in early 2005, with a stretch opened by 2006. By 2007, the entire expressway was completed in full. The expressway is heading into Tianjin and linked up with the Jinji Expressway.

Route
This expressway is projected to head east. It begins at Huanggang Bridge on Jingcheng Expressway between 5th Ring Road and the 6th Ring Road and stretch to central Pinggu in eastern Beijing.

The route was "agreed in principle" by the planning authorities; however, the route was slightly altered. It would start at Liqiao on the 6th Ring Road and the Litian Expressway would link it.

The stretch that starts at Liqiao was connected to Huanggang Bridge.

Connections
There would be connections at the following points:

 Jingcheng Expressway: Huaggang Bridge
 Airport Expressway (Beijing): Wenyu Bridge
 6th Ring Road (Beijing): Litian Bridge

Road transport in Beijing
Expressways in China